In mathematics, an algebraic expression is an expression built up from constant algebraic numbers, variables, and the algebraic operations (addition, subtraction, multiplication, division and exponentiation by an exponent that is a rational number). For example,  is an algebraic expression. Since taking the square root is the same as raising to the power , the following is also an algebraic expression:

An algebraic equation is an equation involving only algebraic expressions.

Usually,  is constructed as a geometric relationship, and the definition of  requires an infinite number of algebraic operations.

A rational expression is an expression that may be rewritten to a rational fraction by using the properties of the arithmetic operations (commutative properties and associative properties of addition and multiplication, distributive property and rules for the operations on the fractions). In other words, a rational expression is an expression which may be constructed from the variables and the constants by using only the four operations of arithmetic. Thus, 

is a rational expression, whereas 

is not.

A rational equation is an equation in which two rational fractions (or rational expressions) of the form 

are set equal to each other. These expressions obey the same rules as fractions. The equations can be solved by cross-multiplying. Division by zero is undefined, so that a solution causing formal division by zero is rejected.

Terminology

Algebra has its own terminology to describe parts of an expression:
1 – Exponent (power), 2 – coefficient, 3 – term, 4 – operator, 5 – constant,  - variables

In roots of polynomials

The roots of a polynomial expression of degree n, or equivalently the solutions of a polynomial equation, can always be written as algebraic expressions if n < 5 (see quadratic formula, cubic function, and quartic equation). Such a solution of an equation is called an algebraic solution. But the Abel–Ruffini theorem states that algebraic solutions do not exist for all such equations (just for some of them) if n  5.

Conventions

Variables
By convention, letters at the beginning of the alphabet (e.g. ) are typically used to represent constants, and those toward the end of the alphabet (e.g.  and ) are used to represent variables. They are usually written in italics.

Exponents
When a coefficient is one, it is usually omitted (e.g.  is written ). Likewise when the exponent (power) is one, (e.g.  is written ), and, when the exponent is zero, the result is always 1 (e.g.  is written , since  is always ).

Algebraic and other mathematical expressions
The table below summarizes how algebraic expressions compare with several other types of mathematical expressions by the type of elements they may contain, according to common but not universal conventions.

See also
 Algebraic equation
 Algebraic function
 Analytical expression
 Arithmetic expression
 Closed-form expression
 Expression (mathematics)
 Precalculus
 Polynomial
 Term (logic)

Notes

References

External links
 

Elementary algebra